Lestradea stappersii is a species of cichlid endemic to Lake Tanganyika where it occurs in the southern portion of the lake.  It prefers areas with sandy substrates where it searches for microorganisms in ooze pockets in the sand.  This species can reach a length of  TL.  It can also be found in the aquarium trade.

References

Fish of Zambia
stappersii
Endemic fauna of Zambia
Taxa named by Max Poll
Fish described in 1943
Taxonomy articles created by Polbot